Crystal Cruises is a cruise line now headquartered in Downers Grove, Illinois, USA. It was founded in 1988 by Japanese shipping company Nippon Yusen Kaisha, and sold to Hong Kong-headquartered conglomerate Genting Hong Kong in 2015. Following insolvency in 2022, the Crystal Cruises brand and two cruise ships were bought by A&K Travel Group, to recommence operations in 2023. The new company has announced major refurbishments and enhancements for the two award-winning ships in a Fincantieri shipyard in Trieste, Italy  including increasing the number of butler suites and reducing guest capacity, with plans to resume service in June 2023 with shore excursions curated by Abercrombie & Kent.

History
The company was founded in 1988 by Nippon Yusen Kaisha (NYK). Its first ship was Crystal Harmony.

On March 3, 2015, NYK announced that it was selling Crystal Cruises to Genting Hong Kong. The sale price was US$550 million in cash, subject to certain adjustment items. On May 15, 2015, GHK announced that it had closed on the acquisition.

On July 20, 2015, Crystal announced that it would expand to provide expedition cruises, river cruises, and private jet travel.

However, the plan was dropped on August 5, 2016, citing technical challenges. It also announced a donation of US$350,000 to cover docking costs through to the end of the year.

In September 2019, Crystal Cruises announced that it would have Broadway-themed cruises available starting in 2020.

In August 2020, Crystal cancelled all cruises for the remainder of the year. Its parent company Genting Hong Kong had suspended payments to creditors citing the impact of the COVID-19 pandemic. The new 200-passenger Crystal Endeavor was under construction at the time, with delivery scheduled for November 2020; that was delayed for a year because of the suspension of operations at the MV Werften shipyard in Germany. 

In March 2021, Crystal announced all-Bahamas cruises aboard Crystal Serenity would start on July 3, 2021, with departures from Nassau and Bimini to work around CDC cruise bans due to COVID-19 in the US. Ports of call within the Bahamas included Harbour Island, Great Exuma, Long Island, and San Salvador. All passengers were required to be vaccinated for COVID-19. The opening booking day set a record for the most bookings on a single day in the company's history. Some destinations expressed concerns with the company's announcement, lack of consultation with local stakeholders, and negative impact to their existing tourism economy.

Following the insolvency of Genting Hong Kong, Crystal suspended operations of all its cruise ships in January 2022. Crystal Symphony and Crystal Serenity were subsequently arrested in Freeport, Bahamas over unpaid bills in February, and the company's headquarters in the United States closed. Meanwhile, V.Ships Leisure was appointed by the liquidators to manage Crystal's ships.

On June 22, 2022, it was announced that A&K Travel Group, owned by Manfredi Lefebvre d'Ovidio and Geoffrey Kent had bought the bankrupt line's brand and two ocean vessels, Crystal Serenity and Crystal Symphony, intending to return the ships to service in 2023.

Former Sub-brands

Crystal Yacht Cruises
Crystal Yacht Cruises launched in December 2015 with the Crystal Esprit. The 62-guest, 3,000-ton yacht is outfitted with features including a two-passenger submarine, four 10-passenger zodiacs for excursions, and a 12-passenger yacht tender for boating adventures. Additionally, water skis, wake boards, kayaks, jet skis, fishing, and scuba and snorkel equipment are available.

Crystal Expedition Cruises
On January 15, 2018, the company cut steel for Crystal Endeavor at MV Werften, part of a family of shipyards known for their passenger-ship, icebreaker, and private-yacht building expertise. The new PC6-designated expedition yacht was to launch on July 17, 2021, in Reykjavik, Iceland. Crystal Endeavor has a displacement of 20,200 GT and would operate polar expeditions and voyages in remote tropical regions. The yacht was to offer accommodation for 200 guests.

Crystal River Cruises
In July 2016, Crystal launched Crystal River Cruises with the refurbished vessel . Crystal Bach and Crystal Mahler, the first two of four Rhine-class new-build river ships, were added in 2017 followed by Crystal Debussy and Crystal Ravel, in 2018.

Crystal Luxury Air/Crystal AirCruises
Crystal Luxury Air private jet service launched in 2015 with the company's Bombardier Global Express jet, available for charter and accommodating 12 guests. In August 2017, Crystal AirCruises took flight with the launch of Crystal Skye, a Boeing 777-200LR configured with 88 first-class, flat-bed seats, a lounge/dining room that seats 24, and a full bar. The National Hockey League was one of its first three charter customers. In addition, the company took delivery of a Boeing 787 Dreamliner in May 2017. As of November 2017, this aircraft was in storage.

Fleet

Current fleet

Former fleet

References

Bibliography

External links

 Official website[Archived 24 January 2022]

1988 establishments in the United States
2022 disestablishments in the United States
Transport companies established in 1988
Transport companies disestablished in 2022
Cruise lines
Mitsubishi companies